Lunde is a former municipality in Telemark county, Norway. The municipality centre was Bjervamoen.

It was created by a split from Bø on 1 January 1867. At that time Lunde had a population of 2,257.

On 1 January 1964 the municipality was merged with Holla municipality to form the new municipality Nome. Before the merger Lunde had a population of 3,080. At present certain interests in Lunde want to reunite with Bø.

Lunde was the production site of the Troll automobile, and it is also known as the birthplace of ski racer Atle Skårdal and jazz singer Torun Eriksen.

The name
The municipality (originally the parish) is named after the farm Lunde (Old Norse Lundr), since the first church was built there. The name is identical with the word lundr m 'grove'. (The form Lunde is derived from the dative form lundi.)

References

 
Former municipalities of Norway
Nome, Norway